This is the electoral history of Jay Inslee, the 23rd Governor of Washington since 2013. He previously served in the Washington House of Representatives from 1989 to 1993. He was also a member of the United States House of Representatives from Washington's 4th congressional district from 1993 to 1995 and from Washington's 1st congressional district from 1999 to 2012. Inslee sought the 2020 Democratic nomination for President and centered his candidacy around climate change, but ended his campaign before voting began.

Washington House of Representatives elections

1988

1990

U.S. House of Representatives elections

1992

1994

1998

2000

2002

2004

2006

2008

2010

Washington gubernatorial elections

1996

2012

2016

2020

References 

Jay Inslee
Inslee, Jay